Meduary Union is a union parishad under Bhaluka Upazila of Mymensingh District in the division of Mymensingh, Bangladesh.

Geography 
Meduary Union is bounded by Mokshapur, Uthura, Bharadoba, Dakatia, Malikabari, and Amirabari Union.

Demographics 
According to the National Bureau of Statistics of Bangladesh census report, the number of population was 24,377 in 2011.

References 

Unions of Bhaluka Upazila